The 1992 Women's Silver Unicorn World Team Squash Championships were held in Vancouver, British Columbia, Canada and took place from October 12 until October 17, 1992.

Results

First round

Pool A

Pool B

Pool C

Pool C

Quarter finals

Semi finals

Third Place Play Off

Final

References

See also 
World Team Squash Championships
World Squash Federation
World Open (squash)

World Squash Championships
Squash
W
Squash tournaments in Canada
1992 in women's squash
International sports competitions hosted by Canada